Ptychadena gansi is a species of frog in the family Ptychadenidae. It is endemic to Somalia.

Its natural habitats are dry savanna, subtropical or tropical dry shrubland, subtropical or tropical dry lowland grassland, freshwater marshes, and intermittent freshwater marshes. It is threatened by habitat loss.

References

Ptychadena
Endemic fauna of Somalia
Taxonomy articles created by Polbot
Amphibians described in 1965